James Douglass Post (November 25, 1863 – April 1, 1921) was an American educator, lawyer, and politician who served for two terms as a U.S. Representative from Ohio from 1911 to 1915.

Biography 
Born near Milledgeville, Ohio, Post attended the common schools and was graduated from the National Normal University, Lebanon, Ohio, in 1882.  He engaged in teaching for five years, after which he studied law and was admitted to the bar in 1887 and commenced practice at Washington Court House, Ohio.

Congress 
Post was elected as a Democrat to the Sixty-second and Sixty-third Congresses (March 4, 1911 – March 3, 1915).  He served as chairman of the Committee on Elections No. 1 during the Sixty-third Congress, but he was not a candidate for renomination in 1914.

Later career and death 
He resumed the practice of law at Washington Court House, and died there April 1, 1921, after which he was interred in Washington Cemetery.

Sources

1863 births
1921 deaths
Ohio lawyers
National Normal University alumni
People from Washington Court House, Ohio
19th-century American lawyers
Democratic Party members of the United States House of Representatives from Ohio